The Prix Iris for Best Original Music in a Documentary is an annual award, presented by Québec Cinéma as part of its Prix Iris program, to honour the best music for documentary films made in the Cinema of Quebec. The award was presented for the first time at the 23rd Quebec Cinema Awards in 2021.

2020s

References

Awards established in 2021
Original music in a documentary
Film music awards
Quebec-related lists
Canadian documentary film awards